Tynagh-Abbey/Duniry GAA is a Gaelic Athletic Association club based in the parish of Tynagh, County Galway, Ireland. The club is primarily concerned with the game of hurling

History

As neighbouring parishes, both Tynagh and Duniry often combined in an effort to field teams. In the early years of the 20th century, there were also two separate clubs in Tynagh and Duniry. In 1996, Tynagh and Abbey/Duniry joined forces at under-age level as a result of a decline in population. This paved the way for the amalgamation that was to take place at adult level in 2004.

Honours

 Connacht Intermediate Club Hurling Championships (1): 2009
 Galway Intermediate Hurling Championships (1): 2009
 Galway Minor Hurling Championship (1): 2011

Notable players
 Jim Power
 Paul Killeen
 Shane Moloney
 Liam Hodgins
 Paul Gordon
 Padraig Kelly
 Kevin Broderick

External links
Tynagh-Abbey/Duniry GAA Club website

Gaelic games clubs in County Galway
Hurling clubs in County Galway